Beit Guvrin may refer to a succession of settlements and their archaeological remains, in proper chronology: Maresha, Beit Guvrin, Eleutheropolis, Bethgibelin, Bayt Jibrin, Kibbutz Beit Guvrin and Beit Guvrin National Park.

 Bayt Jibrin, a Palestinian village depopulated in 1948, previously the Roman and Byzantine city of Eleutheropolis
 Beit Guvrin National Park, encompassing the ruins of Bayt Jibrin / Eleutheropolis, as well as Maresha, city from the Iron Age to the Early Roman period
 Beit Guvrin, Israel, a kibbutz founded in 1949